Jow Kandan-e Bozorg (also Romanized as Jow Kandān-e Bozorg; also known as Jow Kandān and Jūkandān) is a village in Saheli-ye Jokandan Rural District, in the Central District of Talesh County, Gilan Province, Iran. At the 2006 census, its population was 801, in 186 families.

Language 
Linguistic composition of the village.

References 

Populated places in Talesh County

Azerbaijani settlements in Gilan Province

Talysh settlements in Gilan Province